Point Pleasant is a small unincorporated community in southern Monroe Township, Clermont County, Ohio, United States. U.S. Route 52 passes through Point Pleasant, where it intersects State Route 232.

History
Point Pleasant was platted in 1813. A post office called Point Pleasant that was established in 1826 remained in operation until 1983. By 1833, Point Pleasant had about 130 inhabitants. The Ohio River flood of 1937 inundated the community.

Point Pleasant is the birthplace of U.S. President Ulysses S. Grant.  The one-story cottage where he was born was taken by barge on a tour across the country, then by rail to Columbus, Ohio, where it was displayed at the Ohio State Fairgrounds. It was returned to Point Pleasant in 1936, where it has been restored with period furniture and opened to tours.

Gallery

References

See also
List of cities and towns along the Ohio River

Unincorporated communities in Ohio
Unincorporated communities in Clermont County, Ohio
Ohio populated places on the Ohio River